The Hague is a city in the western coast Netherlands, the capital of the province of South Holland.

Hague may also refer to:

Organizations
International courts based in The Hague, Netherlands are commonly referred to as "The Hague":

International Court of Justice
International Criminal Court
Permanent Court of Arbitration

People
Albert Hague (1920–2001), German-American songwriter, composer, and actor
Arnold Hague (1840–1917), American geologist
Bill Hague (1852–1898), baseball player
Billy Hague (1885–1969), ice hockey player
Charles Hague (1769–1821), English musician
Sir Douglas Hague (1926–2015), British economist 
Frank Hague (1876–1956), American politician
Joan B. Hague, New York assemblywoman 1979–1982
Joe Hague (1944–1994), American professional baseball player
Keith Hague (born 1946), English professional footballer
Kevin Hague (born 1960), New Zealand politician
Matt Hague (born 1985), American professional baseball player
Mel Hague (born 1943), British country music singer
Molly-Mae Hague (born 1999), Love Island contestant
Neil Hague (disambiguation), several people
Michael Hague (born 1948), American illustrator
Richard Hague (born 1947), American poet
Rob Hague, British drummer
Sam Hague (19th century), British minstrel troupe owner
William Hague (disambiguation), several people:
William Hague, Baron Hague of Richmond (born 1961), British politician.
William Hague (architect) (1840–1899), Irish architect
William Hague (Australian politician) (1854–1924), South Australian parliamentarian
William Hague (boxer) (1885–1951), English boxer
General William Hague, a character in the television series Babylon 5

Places

United States
Hague, Florida
Hague, New York
Hague, North Dakota
Hague, Virginia

Other
Hague, Saskatchewan, Canada
La Hague, France

See also
Hague Convention (disambiguation)
Haig (disambiguation)
Haigh (disambiguation)